Daniel Webster (1782–1852) was a U.S. Senator from Massachusetts from 1845 to 1850. Senator Webster may also refer to:

Alexander Webster (New York politician) (1734–1810), New York State Senate
Charlie Webster (politician) (fl. 1980s–2010s), Maine State Senate
Daniel Webster (Florida politician) (born 1949), Florida State Senate 
Ebenezer Webster (1739–1806), New Hampshire State Senate
Edwin Hanson Webster (1829–1893), Maryland State Senate
Hugh Webster (politician) (born 1943), North Carolina State Senate
Richard M. Webster (1922–1990), Missouri State Senate
Stephen W. Webster (born 1943), Vermont State Senate